Vinchio is a comune (municipality) in the Province of Asti in the Italian region Piedmont, located about  southeast of Turin and about  southeast of Asti.

Vinchio borders the following municipalities: Belveglio, Castelnuovo Calcea, Cortiglione, Mombercelli, Nizza Monferrato, and Vaglio Serra.

References

Cities and towns in Piedmont